The governors of the Mexican state of Quintana Roo, since statehood.

Governors of the Free and Sovereign State of Quintana Roo since 1975

Note: In 2001 Mario E. Villanueva was sentenced to prison due to corruption involving Mexican drug war during his time as governor, the length of his sentence has been extended multiple times as more of his past crimes emerged after his capture.
Note: On 5 June 2017; Roberto Borge was sentenced to prison due to corruption involving during his time as governor. He was the third ex-governor from the PRI, to be sentenced in 2017 following the captures of Tomas Yarrington (Tamaulipas) and Javier Duarte (Veracruz).

Pre-statehood

Political Chiefs of the Federal Territory of Quintana Roo

 1902 – 1903: José María de la Vega
 1903 – 1911: Ignacio A. Bravo
 1911 – 1912: Manuel Sánchez Rivera
 1912: Rafael Egealiz
 1912 – 1913: Alfredo Cámara Vales
 1913: Isidro Escobar Garrido
 1913: Alfonso Carrera Carbó
 1913: Víctor M. Morón
 1913: Arturo Garcilazo Juárez
 1913 – 1915: Annexed to Yucatán
 1915 – 1916: Carlos Plank
 1916 – 1917: Carlos A. Vidal

Governors of the Federal Territory of Quintana Roo

 1917 – 1918: Carlos A. Vidal
 1918 – 1921: Octaviano Solís Aguirre
 1921: Pascual Coral Heredia
 1921 – 1923: Librado Abitia
 1923: Camilo E. Félix
 1923 – 1924: Anastasio Rojas
 1924: Librado Abitia
 1924 – 1925: Enrique Barocio Barrios
 1925: Amado Aguirre Santiago
 1925: Enrique Barocio Barrios
 1925 – 1926: Candelario Garza
 1926: Malrubio de la Chapa
 1926 – 1927: Antonio Ancona Albertos
 1927 – 1930: José Siurob
 1930 – 1931: Arturo Campillo Seyde
 1931: J. Félix Bañuelos
 1931 – 1935: Annexed to Yucatán and Campeche
 1935 – 1940: Rafael E. Melgar
 1940 – 1944: Gabriel R. Guevara
 1944 – 1959: Margarito Ramírez
 1959 – 1964: Aarón Merino Fernández
 1965 – 1967: Rufo Figueroa Figueroa
 1967 – 1970: Javier Rojo Gómez
 1971 – 1974: David Gustavo Gutiérrez

See also

List of Mexican state governors
Quintana Roo Territory
List of governors of dependent territories in the 20th century

References

Quintana Roo